Damaschin Bojincă (1802–1869) was an Imperial Austrian-born Moldavian writer and jurist.

Born into an ethnic Romanian family in Gârliște, Caraș-Severin County, he attended primary school in Oravița and Vršac (Vârșeț), finishing high school in Timișoara. Entering the Vršac theological seminary, he soon left the institution, preferring to study philosophy and later law in Timișoara, Oradea and Budapest. After receiving his law degree in 1824 and taking up work as a lawyer, he also began a cultural activity, working as an editor at Biblioteca românească in Buda under Zaharia Carcalechi. His preferred subjects were philology and history, in the latter field publishing Istoria românilor ("The History of the Romanians"), Istorie a lumii pe scurt ("Short History of the World"), and studies of rulers such as Dimitrie Cantemir, Radu Șerban and Michael the Brave. The work to which he devoted the most time, that he considered his most important and that essentially capped his career in historiography was the 1832-1833 Anticile românilor ("Antiquities of the Romanians"). Moving to Moldavia in 1833, he remained there for the rest of his life, working as a lawyer, as rector of Iași's Socola Monastery seminary and as a teacher at Academia Mihăileană. In 1860–1861, during the United Principalities period, he served as Justice Minister at Iași.

Notes

1802 births
1869 deaths
People from Caraș-Severin County
Romanians in Hungary
Romanian jurists
19th-century Romanian historians
Romanian schoolteachers
Government ministers of the Principality of Moldavia
Members of the Romanian Orthodox Church